In number theory, the fundamental lemma of sieve theory is any of several results that systematize the process of applying sieve methods to particular problems. Halberstam & Richert

write:

Diamond & Halberstam
attribute the terminology Fundamental Lemma to Jonas Kubilius.

Common notation
We use these notations:

  is the number of elements of  not divisible by any prime in  that is 
  is a constant, called the sifting density, that appears in the assumptions below. It is a weighted average of the number of residue classes sieved out by each prime.

Fundamental lemma of the combinatorial sieve
This formulation is from Tenenbaum. Other formulations are in Halberstam & Richert, in Greaves,
and in Friedlander & Iwaniec.
We make the assumptions:
  is a multiplicative function.

There is a parameter  that is at our disposal.

In applications we pick  to get the best error term. In the sieve it is related to the number of levels of the inclusion–exclusion principle.

Fundamental lemma of the Selberg sieve
This formulation is from Halberstam & Richert. Another formulation is in Diamond & Halberstam.

We make the assumptions:
  is a multiplicative function.

  for some small fixed  and all .

The fundamental lemma has almost the same form as for the combinatorial sieve. Write . The conclusion is:

Note that the error term here is weaker than for the fundamental lemma of the combinatorial sieve. Halberstam & Richert remark: "Thus it is not true to say, as has been asserted from time to time in the literature, that Selberg's sieve is always better than Brun's."

Notes

Sieve theory
Theorems in analytic number theory